Dawn Orienne Olivieri (born February 8, 1981) is an American actress. She played Lydia in Heroes and Monica Talbot in House of Lies.

Appeared in the Yellowstone prequel, 1883
appears in Yellowstone

Career
Olivieri appeared in the Showtime series House of Lies, starting in 2012, playing the competitive management consultant and ex-wife of main character Marty Kaan and mother of their son, Roscoe Kaan. She acted as Janice Herveaux in the third season of the HBO series True Blood. She played a reporter and Damon Salvatore's girlfriend Andie Star in the hit CW show The Vampire Diaries. Wrapping up the 4th season on Heroes, she has also completed parts on TBS's My Boys, NBC's Knight Rider, TNT's Trust Me, and SyFy's Stargate: Atlantis, and recurred on CBS's How I Met Your Mother.  Olivieri played a lead role in the SyFy movie Hydra, and voiced Pepper Potts in The Avengers: Earth's Mightiest Heroes. She appeared in the October 2009 issue of Maxim. Olivieri appeared on HBO's Entourage on September 13, 2009, and hosted a contest on Scripped. She voiced Lucy Kuo in the PlayStation 3 video game, Infamous 2, which was released in June 2011.

Filmography

Film

Television

Web

Video games

Notes

External links

 

1981 births
Living people
American people of Italian descent
American television actresses
Actresses from Florida
American female models
American film actresses
Female models from Florida
21st-century American women